Stefan Holtz (born 27 February 1981) is a German sprint canoeist who has competed since 2004. He won seven medals at the ICF Canoe Sprint World Championships with two golds (C-2 500 m: 2009, C-4 1000 m: 2006), three silvers (C-2 500 m: 2006, C-4 500 m: 2007, C-4 1000 m: 2007), and two bronzes (C-2 200 m: 2009, C-4 1000 m: 2005).

References

External links
 Canoe09.ca profile 

1981 births
German male canoeists
Living people
ICF Canoe Sprint World Championships medalists in Canadian